Dennis J. Roch (born November 6, 1973 at Fort Dix, New Jersey) is an American politician who served as a member of the New Mexico House of Representatives from January 2009 to January 2019, representing District 67.

Education
Roch earned his BA in English from Eastern New Mexico University and his MA in English from George Mason University.

Elections
2012 Roch was unopposed for both the June 5, 2012 Republican Primary, winning with 2,061 votes and the November 6, 2012 General election, winning with 8,492 votes.
2008 When District 67 Representative Brian Moore left the Legislature, Roch was unopposed for the June 8, 2008 Republican Primary, winning with 1,465 votes and won the November 4, 2008 General election with 5,496 votes (55.2%) against Democratic nominee Craig Cosner.
2010 Roch was unopposed for both the June 1, 2010 Republican Primary, winning with 1,769 votes and the November 2, 2010 General election, winning with 5,862 votes.

References

External links
Official page at the New Mexico Legislature
Campaign site

Dennis Roch at Ballotpedia
Dennis J. Roch at the National Institute on Money in State Politics

1973 births
Living people
Eastern New Mexico University alumni
George Mason University alumni
Republican Party members of the New Mexico House of Representatives
People from Fort Dix
People from Quay County, New Mexico
21st-century American politicians